FME (For Mobile Equipment) is a miniature 50Ω RF connector series offering excellent performance from DC to 2000 MHz (Note: 2.4GHz for Amphenol 81-169) used primarily with RG-58 or equivalent coaxial cables employed in mobile applications and installations.

The FME female is designed to be low diameter to allow cables it has been installed on to be snaked through the often tight access holes or spaces of a vehicle to the desired equipment location(s) where an FME male adapter to the required equipment connector series is fitted to the female cable connector. The thread is 8mm*0.75mm pitch, and the centre pin is 1.14-1.22mm diameter, with radiused end.

There is an extensive array of FME inter-series adapters available and a male cable connector is also offered for both RG-58 and RG-174 type cables to facilitate extensions, splices or transitions.

References

External links

rfconnector.com
rightchannelradios.com

RF connectors